The San Diego Surge was a team of the Women's Football Alliance that began play in the 2011 season. Home games for the 2012 season will be played at Santana High School in Santee California. In past seasons, the Surge played at Marauder Stadium on the campus of Mira Mesa Senior High School.

In their first season, the Surge finished 8–0, winning their division, and won the American Conference championship over the Dallas Diamonds before losing to the Boston Militia in the WFA championship game.

On September 10, 2019, the San Diego Surge ceased operations indefinitely.

Season-By-Season
* = current standing

2012 roster

2011

Standings

Season Schedule

2012

Season schedule

References

External links
Official website

Women's Football Alliance teams
American football teams in San Diego
American football teams established in 2011
2011 establishments in California
Women's sports in California